Seh Vatal (also Romanized as Seh Vatāl) is a village in Baryaji Rural District, on the border of the Central District of Sardasht County, West Azerbaijan Province, Iran. At the 2006 census, its population was 179, in 42 families.

References 

Populated places in Sardasht County